China Huadian Corporation (Huadian Group) is one of the five largest state-owned power generation enterprises in China, administrated by SASAC for the State Council. It engages in the generation and supply of electricity and heat, and the development of power-related primary energy. It produces about 10% of China's power along with Huaneng Group, Datang Group, SPIC and China Energy.

Subsidiaries
 Huadian Power International (华电国际电力股份有限公司) (SEHK: 1071, SSE: 600027, A share), which is listed on the Hong Kong Stock Exchange and Shanghai Stock Exchange, is the Group's major subsidiary company. It operates thermal powers stations in China.
 Huadian Energy is an electric power subsidiary based in Harbin, Heilongjiang province.
 Huadian New Energy Development Company Limited (华电新能源发展有限公司) is the Group's main renewables subsidiary.
 China Fortune International Trust (100%)

References

External links
 

Companies based in Beijing
Electric power companies of China
Government-owned companies of China
Chinese companies established in 2002
Energy companies established in 2002